Lake Botos, is a crater lake located inside the Poás Volcano National Park.

Location 

It is located in Alajuela province of Costa Rica.

Physical aspects 

Lake Botos is located within Botos cone crater, it has an almost circular outline. It is around 7,540 years old, drains through Angel River, and surrounding forest is classified as tropical, subtropical and some páramo vegetation. There are around 23 algae species.

Social and economic uses 

As part of the Poás Volcano National Park, one of the most visited national parks in the country, this lake benefits the tourism industry. Access trails are paved and the viewpoint is easily accessed.

Gallery

See also 
 List of lakes in Costa Rica
 List of volcanoes in Costa Rica

References 

Geography of Alajuela Province
Tourist attractions in Alajuela Province
Botos
Botos